Abacetus alaticollis is a species of ground beetle in the subfamily Pterostichinae. It was described by Straneo in 1957 and is an endemic species found in Mozambique, Africa.

References

Endemic fauna of Mozambique
alaticollis
Insects of Southern Africa